Austria competed at the 1984 Winter Olympics in Sarajevo, Yugoslavia.

Medalists

Alpine skiing

Anton "Jimmy" Steiner was the only Austrian competitor to win an olympic medal (bronze) in the 1984 Winter Olympics.

Men

Women

Biathlon

Men

Men's 4 x 7.5 km relay

 1 A penalty loop of 150 metres had to be skied per missed target.
 2 One minute added per missed target.

Bobsleigh

Cross-country skiing

Men

Men's 4 × 10 km relay

Ice hockey

Group B
Top two teams (shaded ones) advanced to the medal round.

Finland 4-3 Austria
Canada 8-1 Austria
Czechoslovakia 13-0 Austria
USA 7-3 Austria
Austria 6-5 Norway

Luge

Men

(Men's) Doubles

Women

Nordic combined 

Events:
 normal hill ski jumping 
 15 km cross-country skiing

Ski jumping

Speed skating

Men

References
Official Olympic Reports
International Olympic Committee results database
 1984 Olympic Winter Games 1984, full results by sports-reference.com

Nations at the 1984 Winter Olympics
1984
Winter Olympics